Yoo Jin-sun (born July 12, 1962 in Seocheon, Chungcheongnam-do) is a former tennis player from South Korea, who represented his native country as a qualifier at the 1988 Summer Olympics in Seoul. There he was defeated in the first round by the number twelve seed from Israel, Amos Mansdorf. The right-hander reached his highest singles ATP-ranking on June 13, 1988, when he became the number 194 of the world.

External links

1962 births
Living people
South Korean male tennis players
Tennis players at the 1988 Summer Olympics
Olympic tennis players of South Korea
Asian Games medalists in tennis
Tennis players at the 1986 Asian Games
Tennis players at the 1990 Asian Games
Medalists at the 1986 Asian Games
Medalists at the 1990 Asian Games
Asian Games gold medalists for South Korea
Asian Games silver medalists for South Korea
Sportspeople from South Chungcheong Province
20th-century South Korean people